Ginty Lush (14 October 1913 – 23 August 1985) was an Australian cricketer. He played twenty first-class matches for New South Wales between 1933/34 and 1946/47.

See also
 List of New South Wales representative cricketers

References

External links
 

1913 births
1985 deaths
Australian cricketers
New South Wales cricketers
Cricketers from Melbourne
D. G. Bradman's XI cricketers